Keno is an unincorporated community in Klamath County, Oregon, United States, southwest of Klamath Falls on the Klamath River near Oregon Route 66. As of 2000, the population was 1,059.

Keno was supposedly named after the first postmaster's bird dog. It was previously called Plevna and Whittles Ferry. Keno post office was established in 1887.

One hundred eighty eight children attend Keno's one school, Keno Elementary. It is a K–6 school in the Klamath County School District.

Demographics

Climate
This region experiences warm (but not hot) and dry summers, with no average monthly temperatures above .  According to the Köppen Climate Classification system, Keno has a dry-summer humid continental climate, abbreviated "Dsb" on climate maps.

References

External links
Historic image of bridge over Oregon Route 21 near Keno from Salem Public Library

Unincorporated communities in Klamath County, Oregon
1887 establishments in Oregon
Populated places established in 1887
Unincorporated communities in Oregon